Salcedo is a village and council located in the municipality of Lantarón, in Álava province, Basque Country, Spain. As of 2020, it has a population of 113.

Geography 
Salcedo is located 36km west-southwest of Vitoria-Gasteiz.

References

Populated places in Álava